Totò Le Mokò is a 1949 Italian comedy film. The title alludes to the French film Pépé le Moko.

Synopsis
The mobster Pepé Le Mokò dies during a shootout with the police. His gang decide that his successor will be a relative of his from Naples: Antonio Lumaconi (Totò Le Mokò), a street musician.

Cast
 Totò: Antonio Lumaconi, Totò Le Mokò
 Gianna Maria Canale: Viviane de Valance
 Carlo Ninchi: Pepè le Mokò
 Carla Calò: Suleima
 Elena Altieri: Nancy Cleim
 Marcella Rovena: Sara, l'indovina
 Franca Marzi: Odette 
 Luigi Pavese: Francois 
 Mario Castellani: Za La Mortadelle 
 Enzo Garinei: La Tulipe
 Armando Migliari: Claude Cleim 
 Gianni Rizzo: la guida nella Casbah

External links
 

1940s Italian-language films
Films directed by Carlo Ludovico Bragaglia
Italian comedy films
1949 comedy films
1949 films
Italian black-and-white films
1950s Italian films
1940s Italian films